Jim Foster may refer to:

 Jim Foster (American football), creator of arena football
 Jim Foster (activist) (1934–1990), LGBT rights and Democratic activist
 Jim Foster (basketball) (born 1948), women's college basketball coach
 Jim Foster (musician) (born 1950), Canadian musician
 Jim Foster (baseball) (born 1971), American baseball coach

See also
 Jimmy Foster (disambiguation)
 James Foster (disambiguation)